The England Lions cricket team toured Sri Lanka in February–March 2017 to play two first-class and five limited overs matches.

Squads

First-Class Series

References 

2018 in Sri Lankan cricket